Argentina women's national goalball team is the women's national team of Argentina.  Goalball is a team sport designed specifically for athletes with a vision impairment.  The team takes part in international goalball competitions.

World Championships

1998 Madrid 

The team competed in the 1998 World Championships, in Madrid, Spain.   The team was one of eleven women's teams participating, and they finished eleventh overall.

2022 Matosinhos 

The team competed in the 2022 World Championships from 7 to 16 December 2022, at the Centro de Desportos e Congressos de Matosinhos, Portugal.  There were sixteen men's and sixteen women's teams.  They placed seventh in Pool A, and thirteenth in final standings.

Regional championships 

The team competes in the IBSA America goalball region.  The winner of the championships usually qualifies for a berth at the World Championships or the Paralympic Games.

2022 São Paulo 

Due to the ongoing COVID-19 pandemic: IBSA America moved from 6 to 13 November 2021, to 18 to 22 February 2022.  The event was held at the Centro de Treinamento Paralímpico (Paralympic Training Center) in São Paulo.  This championships was a qualifier for the 2022 World Championships.  There are twelve women's teams: Argentina, Brazil, Canada, Chile, Colombia, Costa Rica, Guatemala, Mexico, Nicaragua, Peru, USA, Venezuela.

This was the team's first regional championships appearance, although the men's team has been involved since 2005.  

The team's round-robin section resulted in being mercied by USA (1:11), but mercying Costa Rica (10:0), beating Nicaragua (6:2) and Chile (7:3), and narrowly avoiding mercy by Canada (10:1).  Entering the quarter-finals, they were successful against Mexico (5:4), but lost to Canada (4:2) in the semi-finals.  They were defeated by USA (6:0) in the bronze medal match, to take fourth position overall.

See also 

 Disabled sports 
 Argentina men's national goalball team 
 Argentina at the Paralympics

References

Goalball women's
National women's goalball teams
Argentina at the Paralympics
Goalball in the Americas